Edgar Rosenberg (September 21, 1925December 19, 2015) was an American scholar and Professor of English and Comparative Literature at Cornell University from 1965 until his retirement in 2002.

Early life and education

Born to Jewish parents in Fuerth, Germany, Rosenberg fled Nazi Germany for Switzerland and then Haiti in 1939, reaching New York City in 1940. He knew no English. After graduating from high school he enlisted in the U.S. Army and served in Europe, receiving a Combat Infantry medal in 1944.

On his return he enrolled in Cornell University, attending on the G.I. bill, and earned a B.A. in 1949  and M.A. in 1950.  After receiving a Ph.D at Stanford University in 1958 he taught at Harvard University until 1965.  While there, his popular course on the history of the novel earned high praise, and he published both scholarship and fiction.  He joined Cornell in 1965 as a tenured associate professor, retiring in 2002 as Emeritus Professor of English and Comparative Literature.

Scholarship and teaching

Rosenberg was an inspiring and "fascinating and terrifying" teacher as well as a gifted scholar and creative writer. He is the author of From Shylock to Svengali: Jewish Stereotypes in English Fiction (1960) and some fifty pieces of short fiction, translations, and articles in journals ranging from Esquire to Commentary to The Dickensian. His Norton critical edition of Charles Dickens' Great Expectations (1999) "stands not only as the authoritative edition of that novel but also as a landmark of erudition and a joyful sharing of a life of learning.". In addition to Cornell, he taught at San Jose State College and Harvard University, was Visiting Professor at Stanford University and the University of Haifa, and received Guggenheim, Fulbright, Bread Loaf, and Stanford Fiction Fellowships as well as the Clark Distinguished Teaching Award at Cornell.

References 

1925 births
2015 deaths
Cornell University faculty
Harvard University alumni
Cornell University alumni
Stanford University alumni
German emigrants to the United States